Born in a Crash is a compilation mini-album by the Northern Irish rock band Therapy?. It was released in Europe on 25 August 1993 via A&M Records.

Background 
All tracks were previously released in the UK on different EP's. Tracks 1, 2, 3 and 4 were originally featured on the Face the Strange EP, and tracks 5, 6, 7 and 8 were featured on the Opal Mantra EP.

The mini-album was released on CD only; some editions had colour sleeves while others had black and white sleeves.

All tracks were included on disc 3 of the Troublegum deluxe edition released by Universal Music on 31 March 2014.

Track listing 
All songs written by Therapy?

Personnel 
Therapy?
Andy Cairns – vocals, guitar
Fyfe Ewing – vocals, drums
Michael McKeegan – bass
Technical
Chris Sheldon – producer (tracks 1–5)
Chris Leckie – engineer (tracks 6–8)

Promo videos 
"Turn": directed by Julie Hermelin
"Opal Mantra": directed by Benjamin Stokes

Trivia 
Track 6 recorded live at Columbia University, New York City on 16 April 1993.
Tracks 7 & 8 recorded live at CBGB's, New York City on 25 May 1993.
The sample in "Innocent X" ("What I'd really hate is to have a nail banged through the back of my neck") is taken from the 1968 film If.... and is spoken by actor Malcolm McDowell.
The sample in "Nausea" ("Here I am motherfuckers!") is taken from the 1988 film Ghosts… of the Civil Dead and is spoken by Nick Cave.

References 

Therapy? albums
1993 EPs
Albums produced by Chris Sheldon
1993 compilation albums
A&M Records compilation albums
A&M Records EPs